Sister Kate is singer Kate Taylor's first album, released in 1971.

The album features versions of songs by a number of different artists, including "Where You Lead" and "Home Again" which also appeared on Carole King's Tapestry album that same year, as well as two songs which had been recently been covered by Rod Stewart: "Handbags and Gladrags" and "Country Comfort". "Country Comfort" and "Ballad of a Well Known Gun" are two Elton John/Bernie Taupin compositions. The album also features a composition by Taylor's brother Livingston and two by brother James.

Sister Kate peaked at number 88 on the Billboard charts.

Track listing

Side One
 "Home Again" (Carole King) – 2:18 
 "Ballad of a Well Known Gun" (Elton John, Bernie Taupin) – 4:42
 "Be That Way" (Livingston Taylor) – 2:51 
 "Handbags and Gladrags" (Mike d'Abo) – 3:25 
 "You Can Close Your Eyes" (James Taylor) – 2:34 
 "Look at Granny Run, Run" (Jerry Ragovoy, Mort Shuman) – 2:49

Side Two
 "Where You Lead" (Carole King, Toni Stern) – 2:27 
 "White Lightning" (Jape Richardson) – 2:40 
 "Country Comfort" (Elton John, Bernie Taupin) – 3:39 
 "Lo and Behold/Jesus Is Just All Right" (James Taylor, A. Reid Reynolds) – 2:22 
 "Do I Still Figure in Your Life" (Pete Dello) – 2:19 
 "Sweet Honesty" (Beverley Martyn) – 6:31

Personnel
 Kate Taylor as Sister Kate – vocals, clapping 
 Peter Asher — vocals, backing vocals, clapping
 John Beland – guitar
 Merry Clayton — vocals, backing vocals, background music 
 Sandra Crouch – percussion, tambourine 
 Oma Drake – vocals, backing vocals, background music 
 Abigale Haness – vocals 
 Gail Haness – backing vocals, background music
 John Hartford — banjo 
 Carole King — piano, vocals, backing vocals, string arrangements, background music
 Danny Kortchmar — guitar, percussion, conga, backing vocals 
 Russ Kunkel — drums 
 Charles Larkey – bass 
 Bernie Leadon — guitar 
 The Memphis Horns — horn, horn arrangements
 Wayne Jackson — horn, horn arrangements 
 Andrew Love — horn, horn arrangements
 Joel O'Brian – drums 
 Donna Prater – vocals, backing vocals 
 Linda Ronstadt — vocals, backing vocals, background music 
 Ralph Schuckett – organ, piano, accordion, keyboards 
 Leland Sklar — bass 
 J.D. Souther — guitar, vocals, clapping 
 John Tartaglia – strings, string arrangements 
 James Taylor — guitar

References 

1971 debut albums
Kate Taylor albums
Albums produced by Peter Asher
Cotillion Records albums
Albums recorded at Sunset Sound Recorders